Lasse Lindh (born 27 March 1974) is a Swedish indie pop musician. His debut album, Bra, came out on EMI in 1998, and featured three charting singles in Sweden. Lindh began singing in English for his second album, You Wake Up at Sea Tac (the title is a reference to a line in Fight Club), which was released in 2002. Lindh's relationship with South Korea dates back to 2006: his songs "The Stuff" and "C'mon Through" were used in the MBC TV series Soulmate. In 2014, his song "Run to You" was used in the drama by SBS, Angel Eyes and in 2016-2017, his song "Hush" was used in the Korean drama by tvN, Guardian: The Lonely and Great God, which was starring by Gong Yoo, Kim Go-eun and others. His most recent album returns to Swedish. Lindh has contributed vocals to the recordings of labelmates Club 8.

Discography

Albums

Singles

Soundtrack appearances

Notes

References

Swedish male musicians
Living people
People from Härnösand
1974 births
Melodifestivalen contestants of 2009
Melodifestivalen contestants of 2008